Thomas Connolly may refer to:

Thomas-Louis Connolly (1814–1876), Canadian Roman Catholic archbishop
Tom Connolly (1870–1961), English-born American baseball umpire
Tom Connolly (third baseman) (1892–1966), baseball third baseman
Thomas Arthur Connolly (1899–1991), first Archbishop of Seattle (1951–1975)
Thomas F. Connolly (1909–1996), Vice Admiral, United States Navy, gymnast and Olympic medalist in rope climbing
Thomas Joseph Connolly (1922–2015), American bishop of the Roman Catholic Church
Thomas J. Connolly (born 1958), attorney and politician from the U.S. state of Maine
Tom Connolly (The Blacklist), an episode of the American crime drama The Blacklist

See also
Thomas Conolly (disambiguation)
Thomas Connelly (disambiguation)
Tom Connally (1877–1963), United States Senator
Connolly (surname)